Harrold Independent School District is a public school district based in the community of Harrold, Texas (USA) located in far eastern Wilbarger County.  All students attend school in one building.

On August 15, 2008, The board of the Harrold Independent School District unanimously approved to let teachers bring guns to class.  The identity of these so-called "guardians" are known only to the Superintendent and the school board, who approve each individual.

Academic achievement
In 2009, the school district was rated "recognized" by the Texas Education Agency.

Special programs

Athletics
Harrold High School plays six-man football.

See also

List of school districts in Texas 
List of high schools in Texas

References

External links
 

School districts in Wilbarger County, Texas